Jorge André (11 May 1919 – 23 July 1994) was a Costa Rican sports shooter. He competed in the skeet event at the 1968 Summer Olympics.

References

1919 births
1994 deaths
Costa Rican male sport shooters
Olympic shooters of Costa Rica
Shooters at the 1968 Summer Olympics
Sportspeople from San José, Costa Rica